Ellen Woodbury is an American stone sculptor, former Disney directing animator and character animator who worked at Walt Disney Animation Studios. 

Woodbury grew up in Corning, New York, and she earned a BFA in Film and Art from the College of Visual and Performing Arts at Syracuse University. She attended the Experimental Animation program at the California Institute of the Arts under the mentorship of Jules Engel.

Animator at Disney 
Woodbury worked for over 20 years at Walt Disney Feature Animation where she worked as an animator on films like The Little Mermaid, Beauty and the Beast, Aladdin, and The Lion King, where she supervised the creation of the hornbill Zazu. She was Disney's first female directing animator.

Full-time sculptor 
She moved to Loveland, Colorado, in 2005 to become a full-time sculptor. She taught Character Animation at the Art Institute of Colorado from 2010 to 2014, and ran a character animation workshop along with her class each week. In 2019, the National Sculpture Society presented Woodbury with the 2019 Marilyn Newmark Memorial Grant.

Filmography

References

External links
 
Ellen Woodbury's website
 Creative Talent: Ellen Woodbury
 A Conversation with Ellen Woodbury-And a Closer Look at Zazu

Year of birth missing (living people)
Living people
American animators
American animated film directors
American sculptors
American women sculptors
American women film directors
California Institute of the Arts alumni
Walt Disney Animation Studios people
American women animators